Dialogue: Canadian Philosophical Review (in French: "Revue canadienne de philosophie") is a peer reviewed philosophical journal, publishing articles and book reviews in English and French, edited by Nancy Salay. It is the official journal of the Canadian Philosophical Association and is rated "B" (the second highest category) in the European Reference Index in the Humanities (ERIH).

References

External links 
 
 Dialogue at Cambridge Journals Online

Philosophy journals
Multilingual journals
Cambridge University Press academic journals
Quarterly journals
1962 establishments in Canada
Publications established in 1962